Merkawre Sobekhotep (also known as Sobekhotep VII) was the thirty-seventh pharaoh of the Thirteenth Dynasty of Egypt during the Second Intermediate Period.

Attestations

Contemporary
Merkawre Sobekhotep is attested by a scarab-seal of unknown origin  and by two statues dedicated to Amun. The statues were originally from Karnak and are now in the Egyptian Museum and in the Louvre Museum respectively. The statues present Merkawre Sobekhotep with two sons Bebi and Sobekhotep, both bearing the titles of "king's son" and of "court official".

Non-contemporary
Merkawre Sobekhotep is also named in the Turin canon (Ryholt: row 8 column 8, Gardiner & von Beckerath: row 7, column 8) and in the Karnak king list. The Turin canon credits him with a reign of 2 years, a lost number of months and 3 to 4 days. Consequently, Ryholt attributes him  years of reign.

Chronological position
The exact chronological position of Merkawre Sobekhotep in the 13th dynasty is not known for certain owing to uncertainties affecting earlier kings of the dynasty.

Turin canon
According to the Turin canon, Merkawre Sobekhotep was the immediate successor of Sewadjkare Hori. After Merkawre Sobekhotep's kingship, the sequence of rulers of the 13th dynasty is highly uncertain due to a large lacuna affecting the Turin canon. Four to seven king names are lost to the lacuna.

Speculations
He probably reigned over Middle and perhaps Upper Egypt during the mid-17th century BC from 1664 BC until 1663 BC. Alternatively, the German Egyptologist Thomas Schneider dates this short-lived king's reign from 1646 BC to 1644 BC

Darrell Baker makes him the thirty-seventh king of the dynasty, Kim Ryholt sees him as the thirty-eighth king and Jürgen von Beckerath places him as the thirty-second pharaoh of the dynasty.

References

External links
 Titulary of Sebekhotep VII

17th-century BC Pharaohs
Pharaohs of the Thirteenth Dynasty of Egypt